Genoplesium tasmanicum, commonly known as the Tasmanian midge orchid, is a species of small terrestrial orchid that is endemic to Tasmania. It has a single thin leaf and up to twenty five dark purplish-black and green flowers. It is widespread and common at lower altitudes.

Description
As with others in the genus, the flowers are inverted so that the labellum is above the column rather than below it. There is a dark purplish-black callus in the centre of the labellum and extending nearly to its tip. Flowering occurs from January to April.

Taxonomy and naming
The Tasmanian midge orchid was first formally described in 1991 by David Jones from a specimen collected near Kingston, and the description was published in Australian Orchid Research. In 2002, Jones and Mark Clements changed the name to Corunastylis tasmanica by the change is not accepted by the Australian Plant Census. The specific epithet (tasmanicum) is the Latinised version of "Tasmania".

Distribution and habitat

References

tasmanicum
Endemic orchids of Australia
Orchids of Tasmania
Plants described in 1991